Salboni railway station is a railway station on Kharagpur–Bankura–Adra line in Adra railway division of South Eastern Railway zone. It is situated beside National Highway 60 at Salboni of Paschim Medinipur district in the Indian state of West Bengal. Total 33 Express and Passengers trains stop at Salboni railway station.

History
In 1901, the Kharagpur–Midnapur Branch line was opened. The Midnapore–Jharia extension of the Bengal Nagpur Railway, passing through Bankura District was opened in 1903–04. The Adra–Bheduasol sector was electrified in 1997–98 and the Bheduasol–Salboni sector in 1998–99.

References

Railway stations in Paschim Medinipur district
Adra railway division